Translation Terminology Writing (TTR from the ) is a biannual peer-reviewed academic journal specializing in translation studies. It is published by the Canadian Association for Translation Studies and was established in 1988, by Jean-Marc Gouanvic and Robert Larose (Université du Québec à Trois-Rivières). The editor-in-chief is Aline Francoeur (Université Laval).

Abstracting and indexing
The journal is abstracted and indexed in:
Emerging Sources Citation Index
International Bibliography of Periodical Literature
MLA International Bibliography
Scopus (2002-2012)

References

External links

1988 establishments in Canada
Publications established in 1988
Translation journals
Multilingual journals

Translation studies